Guillermo "El Pando" Ramírez Ortega (born 26 March 1978 in Livingston, Guatemala) is a Guatemalan former soccer player who was suspended for life from any soccer related activities due to his participation in money laundering and fixing games along with fellow national team members Yony Flores and Gustavo Cabrera.

Ramírez was also the captain of the Guatemala national team.

Club career

Los Angeles Galaxy
He played the 2005 season on loan for the Los Angeles Galaxy of Major League Soccer. He struggled, scoring a lone goal during the regular season, but in the playoffs, in his only appearance, as a substitute in the MLS Cup Final, he scored the game-winner in extra time to give Galaxy its second MLS title. This feat was in high contrast with his poor scoring percentage in the MLS regular season, with 62 shots and 1 goal, which incidentally came from a penalty.

Ramírez is perhaps the most unlikely MLS Cup MVP in league history. He was widely lampooned for his poor shooting and during the ’05 campaign failed to connect on any of his 62 attempts during open play – his only goal came on a penalty kick. Relegated to the bench, Ramírez entered the scoreless Cup final between L.A. and the New England Revolution in 66th minute. In the 107th, with penalty kicks looming, the Guatemalan hit a stunning volley from just outside the penalty area to lift the Galaxy to their second league title.

Ramírez was gone the following season and went on to play in Guatemala and Honduras.

After the 2005 MLS season, Ramírez went back to Municipal, where he remained until 2009, helping the team win four league championships during that period. He then joined C.D. Marathón in the Honduran 2009–2010 league season and had a respectable tournament; he scored in the final to earn the league championship. The following year, he rejoined Municipal, but then in January 2011 he signed a 6-month contract with F.C. Motagua where head coach Ramón Maradiaga wanted him because of the type of player he was under his tenure managing the Guatemala national team. He appeared in the 2011–12 CONCACAF Champions League Preliminary Round, scoring the last goal of a 4–0 win for Motagua against his former club Municipal.

Match fixing allegations and suspension
Ramírez, 34, along with one-time Real Salt Lake defender Gustavo Cabrera and Yony Flores, also a defender, were found guilty by the National Football Federation of Guatemala in September of conspiring to fix a pair of national team exhibitions and a CONCACAF Champions League game between CSD Municipal and Mexico's Santos Laguna.

The trio played together at Municipal in the fall of 2010, when the club finished behind Santos and the Columbus Crew in its first-round group.

Banned from the sport inside their native country in September 2012, the players saw their exile extended worldwide the following month.

International career
Ramírez made his debut for Guatemala in an April 1997 UNCAF Cup match against Costa Rica and has earned 103 caps since.  He has been part of the qualification processes for the World Cups of 2002, 2006, 2010, and 2014. He captained the squad that reached the final stage of the 2006 World Cup qualification. On 27 May 2012, Ramirez was separated from the Guatemala National Team on basis of suspected "to arrange a match's result of Guatemala against South Africa in 2010." In June 2012, this was confirmed by teammates, Luis Rodriguez and Carlos Ruiz. Currently Ramirez is under FIFA investigation as well as by the Ministerio Publico of Guatemala for treason, money laundering and the investigations are still being made.

Honours
Municipal
Liga Nacional de Guatemala League Championships (8): Apertura 2000, Apertura 2004, Clausura 2005, Apertura 2005, Clausura 2006, Apertura 2006, Clausura 2008, Apertura 2009

Los Angeles Galaxy
Major League Soccer MLS Cup (1): 2005

Marathón
Liga Nacional de Fútbol de Honduras League Championship (1) : 2009–10 Apertura

Motagua
Liga Nacional de Fútbol de Honduras League Championship (1) : 2010–11 Clausura

See also
 List of men's footballers with 100 or more international caps

References

External links
 
 
 
 

1978 births
Living people
People from Izabal Department
Guatemalan footballers
Guatemala international footballers
1998 CONCACAF Gold Cup players
2000 CONCACAF Gold Cup players
2002 CONCACAF Gold Cup players
2003 UNCAF Nations Cup players
2005 UNCAF Nations Cup players
2005 CONCACAF Gold Cup players
2011 Copa Centroamericana players
C.S.D. Municipal players
PAS Giannina F.C. players
Atlante F.C. footballers
Chiapas F.C. footballers
LA Galaxy players
C.D. Marathón players
F.C. Motagua players
Super League Greece players
Liga MX players
Major League Soccer players
Guatemalan expatriate footballers
Expatriate footballers in Greece
Expatriate footballers in Mexico
Expatriate soccer players in the United States
Expatriate footballers in Honduras
Liga Nacional de Fútbol Profesional de Honduras players
FIFA Century Club
Sportspeople banned for life
Sportspeople involved in betting scandals
Association football midfielders